Kelagar Mahalleh may refer to:
 Kelagar Mahalleh, Bandpey-ye Gharbi, Babol County
 Kelagar Mahalleh, Bandpey-ye Sharqi, Babol County
 Kelagar Mahalleh, Gatab, Babol County
 Kelagar Mahalleh, Qaem Shahr